Thomas Gregg McNeill  is a former professional American football player who played punter for seven seasons for the New Orleans Saints, Minnesota Vikings, and Philadelphia Eagles. He attended Spring Branch High School, Wharton County Junior College, and Stephen F. Austin State University.

References

1942 births
American football punters
New Orleans Saints players
Minnesota Vikings players
Philadelphia Eagles players
Stephen F. Austin Lumberjacks football players
Living people